Cecil Ralph Howard, 6th Earl of Wicklow (26 April 1842 – 24 July 1891) was an Anglo-Irish British Army officer and peer.

He was a younger son of Rev. Hon. Francis Howard, Vicar of Swords, Dublin, the son of William Howard, 3rd Earl of Wicklow, and his second wife Sarah Hamilton. In 1864 he was commissioned as an Ensign in the King's Royal Rifle Corps, and was promoted to lieutenant in 1867 and to captain in 1876. After his elder brother succeeded to the earldom he was granted the style and precedence of the younger son of an earl by Royal Warrant in 1870. He retired from the regular army in 1877, but joined the Antrim Artillery Militia as a captain in 1879 and was later promoted to major. He succeeded his brother, Charles Howard as Earl of Wicklow on 20 June 1881. On 23 January 1888, he was elected as an Irish representative peer and took his seat in the House of Lords.

He was married twice, firstly on 23 March 1876 to Francesca Maria Chamberlayne (died 30 December 1877) by whom he had one son, and secondly, on 2 June 1880 to Fanny Catherine Wingfield, by whom he had two further sons, Cecil Mervyn Malcolm (18 November 1881 – 16 April 1882) and Hugh Melville (28 March 1883 – 17 February 1919).

The 6th Earl died on 24 July 1891 and was succeeded by his eldest son from his first marriage, Ralph Howard (24 December 1877 – 11 October 1946.

References

1842 births
1891 deaths
19th-century Anglo-Irish people
Cecil
Irish representative peers
King's Royal Rifle Corps officers
6